Road Club is the last of four Japan-exclusive EPs by A-ha. Like the other three EPs, it is quite rare due to being only released in Japan.It reached #42 on the Japanese albums chart. Tracks 1 & 3 were included on the 2015 deluxe edition of the album Stay on These Roads. Track 4 was included on the 2010 deluxe edition of the album Hunting High and Low. Tracks 2 and 4 were included on the 2015 expanded edition of the album Hunting High and Low.

Track listing
 "The Blood That Moves the Body" (extended version) – 5:26
 "Take On Me" (extended version) – 4:51
 "Stay on These Roads" (extended version) – 6:14
 "Hunting High and Low" (extended remix) – 6:03
 "Soft Rains of April" (original mix) – 3:15

References

 	   

A-ha albums
1988 EPs
1988 remix albums
Warner Records remix albums
Warner Records EPs
Remix EPs